Lancashire Adult Learning  is an adult education college located in Lancashire, England .

Courses offered by the college are aimed primarily at adult learners rather than recent school leavers, and include short courses, weekly courses, ESOL programmes and Functional Skills.

See also
 The Adult College, Lancaster
 Alston Hall

External links
 Lancashire College

Buildings and structures in Chorley
Education in Chorley
Further education colleges in Lancashire
Adult education in the United Kingdom